Shihu is a town in Lianshui County, Jiangsu province, China. , it administers the following three residential neighborhoods and 14 villages:
Neighborhoods
Shihu
Guoyuan
Sixing

Villages
Waikou Village
Wafang Village
Qizhuang Village
Wulijing Village
Shiqipu Village
Louzhuang Village
Zhujiawei Village
Sanqi Village
Fangwei Village
Zhanggu Village
Xueji Village
Xuma Village
Dongxing Village
Huaize Village

References

Township-level divisions of Jiangsu
Lianshui County